Shantungosaurus (meaning "Shandong Lizard") is a genus of very large saurolophine hadrosaurid dinosaur found in the Late Cretaceous Wangshi Group of the Shandong Peninsula in China, containing a single species, Shantungosaurus giganteus. The stratigraphic interval of Shantungosaurus ranges from the top of the Xingezhuang Formation to the middle of the Hongtuya Formation, middle to late Campanian in age.

History of discovery
 
First described in 1973, Shantungosaurus is known from over five incomplete skeletons. Chinese scientist Xing Xu and his colleagues indicate that Shantungosaurus is very similar to and shares many unique characters with Edmontosaurus, forming a node of an Edmontosaurus–Shantungosaurus clade between North America and Asia, based on the new materials recovered in Shandong. Remains of several individuals, including skull bones, limb bones, and vertebrae, were found in Shandong, China. These specimens were classified in the new genus and species Zhuchengosaurus maximus in 2007. However, further study showed that the supposedly distinct features of Zhuchengosaurus were simply a result of different growth stages.

Description

Shantungosaurus giganteus is one of the largest known ornithischians. Another mounted skeleton, originally referred to as Zhuchengosaurus maximus, measures  in length. Like all hadrosaurs its beak was toothless, but its jaws were packed with around 1,500 tiny chewing teeth. A large hole near its nostrils may have been covered by a loose flap of skin, which could be inflated to make sounds.

Classification 

Recent maximum parsimony-based phylogenetic analyses of Hadrosauroidea from Xing and colleagues recovered a stable sister group relationship between Edmontosaurus and Shantungosaurus. Shantungosaurus is the single hadrosaurid from the Zhucheng area that is considered valid. Zhuchengosaurus and Huaxiaosaurus, both of which are known from the same region, have been interpreted by the analyses as junior synonyms of Shantungosaurus. All unequivocal morphological discrepancies among these three taxa could be attributed to intraspecific variation (ontogenetic and polymorphic variation) and post-depositional distortion.

The following cladogram is the result of Prieto-Márquez et al. in 2016. It shows the position of Shantungosaurus as sister group of Edmontosaurus in the Edmontosaurini clade:

See also

 Timeline of hadrosaur research

References

Sources
 
 

Late Cretaceous dinosaurs of Asia
Saurolophines
Monotypic dinosaur genera
Fossil taxa described in 1973
Ornithischian genera